East Grand Rapids High School is a public  secondary school located in East Grand Rapids, Michigan, United States. It serves grades 9–12 for the East Grand Rapids Public Schools.

Athletics
The EGRHS Pioneers compete in the Ottawa-Kent Conference. School colors are blue and gold. The following Michigan High School Athletic Association (MHSAA) sanctioned sports are offered:

Baseball (boys) 
State champion – 2009
Basketball (girls and boys) 
Boys state champion – 1950
Bowling (girls and boys) 
Cross country (girls and boys) 
Girls state champion – 2003, 2004, 2008, 2009, 2011, 2018, 2019
Debate
State Champion – 1997
Football (boys) 
State champion – 1976, 1983, 1993, 1995, 2002, 2003, 2006, 2007, 2008, 2009, 2010
Golf (girls and boys) 
Boys state champion – 1939 (tie), 1950, 1951, 2005
Girls state champion - 1979, 1999
Ice hockey (boys) 
Lacrosse (girls and boys) 
Boys state champion – 2007, 2008, 2009, 2017, 2018, 2021
Girls state champion – 2012, 2013, 2014, 2015, 2016, 2019, 2021
Skiing (girls and boys) 
Boys state champion – 1997, 1999
Soccer (girls and boys) 
Girls state champion – 2000, 2001, 2002
Softball (girls) 
Swim and dive (girls and boys) 
Boys state champion – 1948, 1949, 1950, 1951, 1952, 1953, 1954, 1955, 1956, 1957, 1958, 1959, 1960, 1961, 1962, 1976, 1977, 1978, 1979, 1980, 1981, 1982, 2008, 2010, 2013, 2021, 2022
Girls state champion – 1978, 1979, 1981, 1982, 1983, 1984, 1985, 1986, 1988, 1992 (tie), 1993, 1998, 1999, 2000, 2001, 2009, 2010, 2013, 2014, 2016, 2018, 2019
Tennis (girls and boys) 
Boys state champion – 1936, 1955, 1956, 1960, 1965, 1970, 1971 (4-way tie), 1972 (tie), 1973, 1975, 1977–1979, 2001, 2003, 2007
Track and field (girls and boys) 
Boys state champion – 1940, 1944, 1946, 1948, 1950, 1958
Volleyball (girls) 
State champion – 2013
Wrestling (boys) 

The Pioneers' boys' and girls' water polo teams compete in the Michigan Water Polo Association (MWPA), while the coed crew team is a member of the Scholastic Rowing Association of Michigan. The sailing team is a member of the Midwest Interscholastic Sailing Association (MISSA). The girls' field hockey team is a member of the Michigan High School Field Hockey Association, and girls also participate in a competitive Dance Team a member of the "Universal Dance Association" (UDA). The boys' lacrosse team won six Michigan High School Lacrosse Coaches Association (MHSLCA) titles before the sport was sponsored by the MHSAA. The school has a notable rivalry with Lowell High School.

Performing Arts Center 
The Performing Arts Center (PAC) is a 671-seat performance hall used for drama productions and musical performances. It features a full orchestra pit, dressing and makeup rooms, and a green room. Built in October 2002, the facility cost $21 million.

On April 20, 2007, President George W. Bush visited East Grand Rapids High School's Performing Arts Center to speak about the War on Terror, an event sponsored by the World Affairs Council. On December 5, 2007, former Michigan gubernatorial candidate Dick DeVos gave a speech to students regarding leadership.

Notable alumni
Jim Boylen, former head coach of the Utah Utes men's basketball team, former head coach of the Chicago Bulls.
Doris Cole (born 1938, class of 1955), architect and author
Allie Dragoo (born 1989), USA Cycling Cervelo Bigla Pro Cycling professional cyclist
Luke Glendening, NHL hockey player 
Adam Herz, screenwriter
John Hockenberry, journalist
Luke Jensen, former professional tennis player
Laura Kasischke, poet and novelist
John McNamara, writer
L. William Seidman, economic advisor to Presidents Gerald Ford and Ronald Reagan, chairman of the FDIC and co-founder of Grand Valley State University.
Chris Van Allsburg, author and illustrator of children's books
Peter Meijer, Republican who represented Michigan's 3rd congressional district from 2021 to 2023
Elizabeth M. Welch, Associate Justice on the Michigan Supreme Court
Austin Beutner, Businessman, former publisher and CEO of Los Angeles Times, superintendent of Los Angeles Public School District
Henry F. Schaefer III, one of the most highly cited chemists in the world
Gillian Sorensen, former United Nations Assistant Secretary-General for External Relations
Martha Teichner, television news correspondent
John Ronan, Architect, designer and educator
David McLaughlin, 14th President of Dartmouth College
Ryan McInerney, President of Visa Inc.
Natalie Fratto, Vice President at Goldman Sachs
Dave Engbers, co-founder of Founders Brewing Company
Jeanne Brooks-Gunn, Co-Director of the National Center for Children and Families at Teachers College, Columbia University
Steve Belkin, founder of Trans National Group
Steve Pestka, former member of the Michigan House of Representatives

References

External links
East Grand Rapids High School (official home page)
Diversity in Michigan
"The Jocks, the Jets, the Grubbies and the Ghosts of the Past"

Public high schools in Michigan
Educational institutions established in 1917
Schools in Kent County, Michigan
East Grand Rapids, Michigan
1917 establishments in Michigan